= King of the Kippax =

King of The Kippax is a Manchester City F.C. fanzine.

King of the Kippax was started in 1988. The April 2018 edition was the 250th edition, in its 30th season, available in print form and electronically via Amazon Kindle.

The fanzine is edited and written by Dave & Sue Wallace, with contributions from various other people.

A 2001 article in The Guardian newspaper featured the fanzine.
